Danghara District or Nohiya-i Danghara is a district in Khatlon Region, Tajikistan. Its capital is the town Danghara. The population of the district is 161,000 (January 2020 estimate).

Administrative divisions
They are as follows:

References

Districts of Khatlon Region
Districts of Tajikistan